Ayşegül Ergin Boyalı (born Ayşegül Ergin in 1971) is a former Olympian Turkish female Taekwondo practitioner.

At the 1992 Summer Olympics in Barcelona, Spain, she competed for Turkey, and became the runner-up after losing to Tung Ya-Ling from Chinese Taipei in the final game. The Taekwondo competitions were held as demonstration sport, and therefore no medals were awarded.

She is married to World Taekwondo Championship medalist Ekrem Boyalı.

Achievements
  1991 Intern. German Championships - Idar-Oberstein, Germany -55 kg
  1991 World Championships - Athens, Greece -55 kg
  1992 Pre-Olympic Games - Barcelona, Spain -55 kg
  1994 European Championships - Zagreb, Croatia -55 kg

References

1971 births
Place of birth missing (living people)
Turkish female taekwondo practitioners
Turkish female martial artists
Olympic taekwondo practitioners of Turkey
Taekwondo practitioners at the 1992 Summer Olympics
Living people
World Taekwondo Championships medalists
European Taekwondo Championships medalists
20th-century Turkish sportswomen
21st-century Turkish sportswomen